Todor Kostov Boyadzhiev (10 October 1939 – 25 November 2022) was a Bulgarian engineer and politician. A member of the Communist Party, he served in the National Assembly from 2001 to 2005.

Boyadzhiev died in Gramatikovo on 25 November 2022, at the age of 83.

References

1939 births
2022 deaths
Bulgarian engineers
Members of the National Assembly (Bulgaria)
Bulgarian Communist Party politicians
Technical University, Sofia alumni
People from Karnobat